Ritchie Mark Hawkins (born 9 November 1983 in Peterborough, England), is a former motorcycle speedway rider from England.

Career 
In 2004, he became British Under 21 Champion and has represented Great Britain at Under-21 level. His father Kevin rode. In 2006, he suffered severe bruising to the brain following a track crash in Workington, forcing him to miss the rest of that season.

A crash during a pre-season indoor meeting in Kiel, Germany during 2008, resulted in multiple injuries, including fractures to his right ankle, both wrists, broken arm, shattered femur, and internal injuries. He made a track return the following year.

His racing career ended during the 2015 season, while captaining the Ipswich Witches. Broken ribs suffered on the opening night and a loss of form contributed to his leaving the side halfway through the year. At the end of that season, it was announced that Ritchie would be returning to the club as the new team manager.

References 

1983 births
Living people
British speedway riders
English motorcycle racers
Sportspeople from Peterborough
Berwick Bandits riders
Ipswich Witches riders
Mildenhall Fen Tigers riders
Somerset Rebels riders
Swindon Robins riders
Workington Comets riders